WBPA-LD (channel 12) is a low-power television station in Pittsburgh, Pennsylvania, United States, affiliated with Rev'n. The station is owned by Venture Technologies Group.

History
On January 14, 1988, the Federal Communications Commission granted a construction permit to Channel 29 Associates of Calabasas, California—owned by Venture founder Lawrence Rogow—for a new low-power TV station on channel 29 at Pittsburgh, W29AH. The station began test broadcasts on September 28, 1989, airing programming from the Video Jukebox Network.

After five years of running music videos, channel 29 found a new calling in January 1995, when The WB launched. W29AH was intended to serve as one half of a simulcast with Johnstown's WTWB-TV channel 19, filling the largest missing market gap for the new network. W29AH became WTWB-LP on June 1, 1995, and WBPA-LP on December 15. Channels 19 and 29 became the new UPN affiliate in 1998 when that network's former outlet, WPTT channel 22, switched to The WB (with WTWB-TV becoming WNPA); they briefly were independents due to lawsuits surrounding that station's change.

Venture sold channel 19 to the Paramount Stations Group late in 1998, making it a network owned-and-operated station and splitting it from WBPA-LP. For several months, the two continued simulcasting. In the early 2000s, WBPA-LP moved to channel 30.

In 2012, Venture sought to build digital facilities for WBPA-LP on channel 6, utilizing hybrid analog-digital technology to turn it into a "Franken-FM" station with audio on 87.7 MHz. The FCC denied this proposal on technical grounds with the standard that the company proposed for WBPA and a station in Lubbock, Texas.

WBPA-LP was displaced during the repack by Class A station WPTG-CD and applied to move to channel 12 and convert to digital. The station went silent to allow WPTG-CD to move in 2019, but delays from the COVID–19 pandemic, the availability of transmitter installers, and a contracted electrician's foot operation set the reconstruction of WBPA back enough that Venture had to apply for a waiver to avoid automatic license cancellation. The facility was completed in late October, when a license to cover was filed.

Technical information

Subchannels
The station's digital signal is multiplexed:

References

External links

Television stations in Pittsburgh
Low-power television stations in the United States
1989 establishments in Pennsylvania
Television channels and stations established in 1989
Rev'n affiliates
YTA TV affiliates
NewsNet affiliates